Diana Furchtgott-Roth (born 1958) is an economist who is adjunct professor of economics at George Washington University and a columnist for Forbes.com and Tax Notes. She served as Deputy Assistant Secretary for Research and Technology at the United States Department of Transportation during the Trump Administration. She previously served as Acting Assistant Secretary for Economic Policy at the U.S. Department of the Treasury. Before joining the Trump Administration, Furchtgott-Roth served as a senior fellow and director of Economics21 at the Manhattan Institute for Policy Research. She was nominated by President Donald Trump to become Assistant Secretary of Transportation for Research and Technology. On January 3, 2021, her nomination was returned to the President under Rule XXXI, Paragraph 6 of the United States Senate. Furchtgott-Roth was previously the chief economist of the United States Department of Labor, chief of staff of the President's Council of Economic Advisers, deputy executive director of the United States Domestic Policy Council, and junior staff economist at the Council of Economic Advisers. A former columnist for MarketWatch, she has authored seven books.

Education and career
Diana Roth was born to Ellen and Gabriel Roth in England in 1958. Her family moved to America in 1967. Her father was an economist at the World Bank."Profile: Gabriel Roth", Independent Institute. Accessed 25 December 2022. They lived in Chevy Chase, Maryland. After receiving a B.A. from Swarthmore College, Roth returned to England and earned a M.Phil. in economics at Oxford University.

Furchtgott-Roth was an economist on the staff of President Ronald Reagan's Council of Economic Advisers in 1986–87. From 1991 to 1993, she was deputy executive director of the White House Domestic Policy Council and associate director of the State Department's Office of Policy Planning under President George H. W. Bush. From 1993 to 2001, she was a resident fellow and assistant to the president at the American Enterprise Institute. In 2001–02, Furchtgott-Roth was the chief of staff of President George W. Bush's Council of Economic Advisers, and from 2003 to 2005, she was chief economist at the United States Department of Labor. From 2005 to 2011, she was a senior fellow at the Hudson Institute. Furchtgott-Roth is currently an adjunct professor at George Washington University. Her book Disinherited: How Washington Is Betraying America's Young, coauthored with Jared Meyer, received the 2016 Sir Antony Fisher International Memorial Award.

Views
Furchtgott-Roth argues that a regime of lower taxes and less regulation will increase economic growth. She has argued that raising the minimum wage would reduce the number of jobs available to low-skill workers and teens. She has proposed that the Federal government should pay to complement and back up the Global Positioning System because it is used by millions of Americans and is central to the economy. Furchtgott-Roth has made contributions to The Federalist Society. On questions of interest rate management as a lever of economic growth, she favors the Taylor rule - a stable rate tied to the rate of GDP.

Personal life
Furchtgott-Roth is married to Harold W. Furchtgott-Roth and the couple have six children.

Bibliography
 Women's Figures: All Illustrated Guide to the Economic Progress of Women in America (1999, second edition, 2012)
 The Feminist Dilemma: When Success Is Not Enough (2001) 
 Overcoming Barriers to Entrepreneurship in the United States (2008) (editor)
 How Obama's Gender Policies Undermine America (2010)
 Regulating to Disaster: How Green Jobs Policies Are Damaging America's Economy (2012)
 Disinherited: How Washington Is Betraying America's Young (2015) (co-authored with Manhattan Institute fellow Jared Meyer) 
 United States Income, Consumption, Wealth, and Inequality (2020) (editor)

References

External links
 

1958 births
Living people
Swarthmore College alumni
Alumni of the University of Oxford
American women economists
21st-century American economists
Chief Economists of the United States Department of Labor
George Washington University faculty
Manhattan Institute for Policy Research
Reagan administration personnel
George W. Bush administration personnel
Trump administration personnel
United States Department of the Treasury officials
United States Department of Transportation officials